Christ Child, also known as In the Beginning or the Millennium Sculpture, is an outdoor sculpture by Michael "Mike" Chapman, located under the portico of St Martins-in-the-Fields at Trafalgar Square in London, United Kingdom. The opening text from the Gospel of John is inscribed around the sculpture: "In the beginning was the word and the word became flesh and lived among us". Chapman has said of the sculpture: "For the millennium I was commissioned to produce a sculpture to be placed in Trafalgar square, during Christmas prior to the celebrations. It seemed to me that a tiny life-size baby carved from stone in such an enormous environment would be the best way to remind us all of just whose birthday we were celebrating. In a 4.5 tonne block of Portland stone, this work can be found at the entrance to the church." It has been called "strikingly modern".

See also

 1999 in art

References

External links
 

1999 sculptures
Limestone sculptures in the United Kingdom
Monuments and memorials in London
Nude sculptures in the United Kingdom
Outdoor sculptures in London
Sculptures of children in the United Kingdom
Statues of the infant Jesus
Trafalgar Square